John Tarrant may refer to:

 John Tarrant (athlete) (1932–1975), English long-distance runner
 John Tarrant (Zen Buddhist), founder of the Pacific Zen Institute
 John Tarrant (bishop), Episcopal bishop
 John Tarrant, Australian actor, best known for serial A Country Practice